Aptera Motors Corp. (formerly Aptera Motors Inc. and before that Accelerated Composites) is an American crowd funded startup company based in Carlsbad, California specializing in solar electric vehicle manufacturing.

Aptera Motors, Inc, was originally founded in 2005 by Steve Fambro and Chris Anthony. By the end of 2008, it had garnered enough publicity to persuade over 4000 people to each put down $500 deposits toward the purchase of a new Aptera vehicle. That incarnation of Aptera folded before the end of 2011, refunded all its deposit holders and liquidated it’s assets before going into production.

Aptera Motors Corp. was started in March of 2019 by the original founders of Aptera Motors, Inc. As of December 2022, the company had 81 employees and was actively fund raising to enable production of its first solar electric vehicle.

Recent History
In 2019, the company, Aptera Motors, was re-formed by the original founders, Chris Anthony and Steve Fambro, as Aptera Motors Corp. It used a crowdfunding campaign to restart development of what aims to be the most efficient road vehicle in production.

The original Aptera Motors' design was a three-wheeled two-seat vehicle named the Aptera 2 Series.

This would make the Aptera the most efficient and the longest-range motor vehicle ever designed for mass production.

In February 2020, the company announced it had raised enough funding to see the Aptera EV into production by the end of 2020.  In a May 2020 update, the company announced it had increased its engineering team from 15 to 60 people worldwide, in 5 locations around the US and in 5 countries around the world. In December 2020, they revealed the first solar-powered Aptera prototype and started taking reservations for it.
 
On December 4, 2020, the company revealed the new Aptera EV prototype, releasing model and option details with prices, and opened pre-orders. Within eight days they received deposits for over 3,000 Aptera vehicles, valued at over $100,000,000. Within 7 weeks the company received deposits for over $200,000,000 worth of vehicles.

In 2021 the company built 3 more engineering prototypes, revised the Aptera design to give it more interior room and an improved suspension, and raised over $39 million in funding. They also acquired 3 buildings in Carlsbad, CA, with a combined space of over 100,000 square feet. This space meets their needs for R&D space, for test vehicle building and for manufacturing space for up to 40 vehicles per day (10,000 vehicles per year).

In their December 2021 video update, the company revealed they had over 8,000 investors, had started construction in their newly acquired factory space, and were "confident we will be able to begin supplying vehicles in the later part of 2022."

A month later in January 2022 the San Diego Business Journal reported their reservations had grown to over 16,000, their employees had doubled to 60 and they were looking to hire 470 more by the end of the year. 

In May of 2022, Aptera Motors' released their 2021 Annual Report. In it they stated that have 103 full- and part-time employees and over 18,000 reservations for their solar electric vehicle. Also as of the end of 2021 they reported they had $23,259,441 in total assets (compared to $1,201,072 in 2020) and a net loss of $18.9 million in 2021 (compared to a loss of $4.2 million in 2020).

In October 2022 they announced the number of reservations had grown to over 35,000.

Planned models

Aptera Solar Electric Vehicle

As of 2019, the first planned production Aptera is a two-seat, three-wheeled passenger battery electric vehicle (BEV).

This estimated range was achieved by using lightweight resin composite materials in a body with a unique aerodynamic design. The resulting vehicle is estimated to require less than 100 Wh of energy per mile, making it about 2.5 times as energy efficient as a Tesla Model 3, with half the Model 3's passenger capacity but more cargo space than the Model 3.

Since most drivers drive less than 30 miles per day, many drivers would seldom or never have to charge. The Aptera was therefore promoted as the world's first "Never Charge" EV. The company's website features a calculator to estimate how often their owners would need to charge an Aptera, based on where they live and how much they drive.

Production and customer availability announcements
Aptera Motors published on their WeFunder page an investor presentation, dated July 2020, with a production plan projecting Aptera first availability in the 2nd quarter of 2021. On December 4, 2020, Aptera Motors revealed the first solar-powered Aptera prototype. On the same day, Chris Anthony wrote, "Delivery for early orders is end of 2021". On January 11, 2021, he added, "If we can raise funds effectively and COVID doesn't continue to be a significant impediment, we should be able to deliver 4 to 6 thousand units in 2022."  However, in September Chris Anthony stated that COVID did cause delays getting parts for the prototypes and getting the prototypes built.

In January 2022, Pablo Ucar, Aptera's Vice President of Production and Procurement, specified, "We’ll start by producing our first few hundred vehicles, our Paradigm Editions. As our supply chain becomes more established, we’ll ramp to 250 per month, and eventually reach our target of producing 40 vehicles per day.". The company's Frequently Asked Question page states first customer deliveries as happening in "late 2022" for the Paradigm Edition. In February 2022, Aptera updated most of the over 16,000 reservation holders to a delivery window of 2023–2024.

A webinar was hosted by Aptera Motors on June 14, 2022 in which they outlined the company's progress on some component systems as well as a revised interior and exterior design with slightly more interior room and efficiency. At this webinar the team announced completion of its third generation (Gamma) prototype design and is aiming to complete its build of the first Gamma prototype in about 4 to 6 weeks. After that, the fourth generation (Delta) pre-production prototype design "will take several more months" to complete. First customer delivery was still aiming for "the end of the year" (2022). Pre-orders surpassed 25,000 during the live streaming of the webinar. They plan to produce 1,000 vehicles in the first few months of production. As 40% of pre-orders are for the nominal 400-mile range (41 kWh battery) version, those first 1,000 vehicles will all be that 400-mile range version. First deliveries will be made to customers near to their headquarters in San Diego County, California.

, over 30,000 vehicles had been reserved, worth about a billion dollars in sales. At Aptera's Gamma prototype reveal on September 10, 2022, Chief Designer Jason Hill said he expected the production intent prototype named Delta to be completed in November. Anthony mentioned crash testing of the first production intent vehicles would likely be completed, and videos of them released, in the second quarter of 2023, so first customer availability would be soon after that time. 

However in January 2023 the company revealed it's new plan for mass production needed more funds to purchase the tooling and equipment needed to start production. They announced new fund raising campaigns and announced they could start production 12 months after the needed funds were raised. This delays first customer availability to 2024 at the earliest.

4-wheeled, 5- or 6-passenger Car
Aptera Motors has stated in the timeline on its web site that it will begin design of a full-sized 6-passenger vehicle in the second half of 2020. However, in February 2020, the founders said their next vehicle will be a 4-wheeled, 5-passenger car. There has been no further production plans of 4 wheeled versions shared publicly.

Early History
The original company was founded by Steve Fambro in 2006 and was originally named "Accelerated Composites"; Fambro had formerly worked at Illumina as an electrical engineer. Fambro hired Chris Anthony to be the COO shortly after founding the company.

The typ-1 model had been classified as a motorcycle. By that time the company had changed its name to Aptera, which is Greek for "wingless", a nod to their light-aircraft-inspired design and construction techniques. However, Aptera Motors maintains that Aptera translates to "wingless flight". Later that year, Aptera signed up to participate in the Progressive Insurance Automotive X Prize. It planned to offer an all-electric vehicle and a hybrid.

In 2008, Aptera Motors hired several industry veterans to oversee engineering and production as well as marketing, and raised $24 million from Google, Idealab, Esenjay, the Simons family, and the Beall Family Trust. When the company announced the funding, it said it would start to sell its car by the end of the year. Near the end of year, it hired Paul Wilbur as CEO, and Fambro stepped down as CEO and assumed the title of Chief Technical Officer. Shortly after Wilbur joined the company, it announced that the launch of the car would be delayed until 2009. By that time, it was calling the "typ-1" the "2e".

In March 2009, the U.S. government denied loans to Aptera Motors under the Advanced Technology Vehicles Manufacturing Loan Program, due to wording that limited loans to four-wheeled-vehicle research and production. After successfully lobbying to change the regulations, in October 2009, the company reapplied for a $184 million loan. In November 2009 the company laid off employees, and both Fambro and Anthony left the company.

The automotive X-prize competition was held in 2010 and Aptera's car entered but didn't finish the 50-lap trial, as its car overheated after 30 laps.

On August 12, 2011, Aptera Motors started to return deposits from customers. and in December 2011, it announced that it was going out of business because it was running out of money; it said that the Department of Energy had offered it a $150 million low interest loan conditioned on the company raising the same amount from the private sector, but the company was not able to raise the matching funds. A New York Times reporter contacted the DoE, which said that it had not committed to loaning the company any money. By that time, the company had abandoned the three-wheeled model and was working on a mid-sized four-wheeled four-door sedan. Also by the time, 60,000 people had expressed interest to the company in buying a 2e, and 2,000 of them had paid a $500 deposit.

In April 2012, the Chinese automaker Zhejiang Jonway Group purchased the intellectual property of Aptera from creditors, and in May, it announced that it would start manufacturing the 2e at its factory in Shanghai and intended to ship chassis to a small assembly plant, initially employing 15-20 people, that it would set up in Santa Rosa, with sales commencing in early 2013. Jonway was a major investor in Zap Jonway, which had been working on electric cars in Santa Rosa since the mid-1990s. The company originally was going to name the US company "Zaptera USA" and it displayed a prototype 2e next to a Zap Jonway car at the Beijing Motor Show; the close association with Zap was met with protest by electric-car enthusiasts and by May, the company said it would call the company Aptera USA and would keep it separate from Zap Jonway.

In June 2013, Zaptera USA said it would split into two companies: the existing Jonway-owned Zaptera USA, and an independent Aptera USA; Zaptera would make the all-electric 2e and Aptera would make a gasoline-powered version called the 2g. However, by mid-May the following year, those new Aptera companies had gone silent.

Aptera Motors Corp.
In 2019, Aptera Motors was re-formed under the leadership of the original founders, Chris Anthony and Steve Fambro, as Aptera Motors Corp. It then began a crowdfunding campaign to restart development and production of their concept for an extremely efficient road vehicle.

Historic vehicles 

Aptera Motors' vehicle design has undergone several design revisions, summarized here. The first two vehicles were intended as concept cars for soliciting investment money rather than production vehicles. The third vehicle, the Aptera 2e, was intended for production, but the funding required was not achieved.

Initial design & rendering
Aptera's introductory press release stated their design would achieve 330 mpg, and included computer renderings of the proposed vehicle. The design also called for a CVT and ultracapacitors, and sell for under US$20,000.

Aptera Mk-0
The target price was unchanged at “around $20,000.”

Aptera Typ-1 / Aptera Mk-1

In September 2007, the Aptera Motors website was updated with information on the new Aptera design (dubbed the Aptera Typ-1), and the Mk-1 pre-production prototype was unveiled. The Mk-0 prototype was redesigned by Jason Hill, who worked on the Smart Fortwo and Porsche Carrera GT and engineered by Nathan Armstrong,
with a finished interior and new body styling. At this time, Aptera Motors started to take reservations from residents of California for its pilot models – then called the Typ-1e and Typ-1h. A gasoline engine was used, due to the way diesel emissions are calculated.

In February 2008, the Mk-1 was featured in an advertisement for Touchstone Energy Cooperatives.

In late 2008, Aptera announced that the Aptera Typ-1 would receive several design changes and would be renamed the Aptera 2e. Differences included front-wheel drive, the addition of side-view mirrors, a redesigned interior, and consolidating the rear-view cameras into a wide-angle “fin” on the roof.

Aptera 2 Series

The Aptera 2 Series was to be a two-seat, three-wheeled passenger vehicle. It was planned to be available in both all-electric (2e) and series hybrid (2h) configurations, at prices ranging from mid-twenty to mid-forty thousand dollars. The April 14, 2010 press release revised the design-intent vehicle-efficiency estimate to about 200 Wh/mi (125 Wh/km),  range from a full 20 kWh battery pack, or around  equivalent. Since then, the vehicle underwent a series of redesigns, including the addition of side mirrors and expansion of the interior space, however, retaining its three-wheel configuration and its aerodynamic teardrop shape. At the Automotive X-Prize, the entered prototype had a tested efficiency of 200 MPGe.

Aptera Motors emphasized that safety was not traded off for efficiency, citing crash-test simulations and component-crush testing as indicating excellent survivability — on par with more conventional vehicles. The company folded before real-world crash test results were made.

The Aptera 2 Series featured optional roof-mounted solar panels for running a heat pump, always-on climate control, and keyless ignition and entry. An in-car touch-screen computer served as entertainment, navigation, and communication system. Side mirrors replaced rear-view cameras on the final prototypes, though one center-mounted camera remained.

Aptera 4-door
By the time of the original company's liquidation in 2011, the company had abandoned development of the Aptera 2e and had started to design a 5-passenger, 4-wheeled EV sedan with a lightweight composite body and a projected 130-mile range. However, no body and only a few test mules for such a car were ever built.

See also 
 Edison2's The Very Light Car
 Commuter Cars
 Energy efficiency in transport

References

External links
 Aptera Motors 2021 Annual Report

Battery electric vehicle manufacturers
Electric vehicle manufacturers of the United States
Motor vehicle manufacturers based in California
Manufacturing companies based in San Diego
Vehicle manufacturing companies established in 2005
Vehicle manufacturing companies disestablished in 2011
Vehicle manufacturing companies established in 2019
2005 establishments in California
2011 disestablishments in California
2019 establishments in California
Privately held companies based in California